Cyclone Inigo is tied with Cyclone Gwenda for being the most intense recorded cyclone in the Australian region in terms of pressure, with the possible exception of Cyclone Mahina. Inigo developed from a tropical low that crossed eastern Indonesia in late March 2003. Becoming a named tropical cyclone on 1 April, Inigo rapidly intensified as it tracked southwestward, reaching a minimum central pressure of 900 hPa on 4 April with maximum 1 minute sustained winds of 170 mph. An approaching trough weakened the cyclone and turned it to the southeast, and on 8 April, Inigo dissipated after making landfall on Western Australia, as a minimal tropical storm.

The precursor disturbance dropped heavy rainfall across eastern Indonesia, causing widespread flooding and mudslides. The worst of the damage was on Flores island, though damage was also reported on West Timor and Sumba. The flooding and mudslides damaged or destroyed thousands of houses, forcing many to leave their homes. A total of 58 casualties were reported in association with Inigo, as a disturbance. In Australia, Inigo produced locally heavy rainfall, but did little damage.

Meteorological history

On 26 March, an area of disturbed weather was located within the near-equatorial trough near Papua New Guinea. Initially located within an area of easterly wind shear, it tracked westward, due to the presence of a ridge to its south, and on 27 March, a low-pressure area formed over Western New Guinea. Thunderstorm activity increased around a mid-level circulation as it crossed into the Arafura Sea, and its overall organisation continued to increase. On 29 March, a low-level circulation was visible, though significant tropical development was prevented due to wind shear and land interaction with islands in the Indonesian archipelago. The system developed into a tropical low on 30 March. After turning to the southwest, the tropical low crossed the island of Flores on 31 March; upon doing so, the storm's convection greatly increased, due to increased upper-level divergence, which produced heavy rainfall on Flores and Timor. On 1 April, wind shear decreased as the system crossed into the Savu Sea, and the storm developed into a tropical cyclone to the northeast of Sumba.

At 1200 UTC on 1 April, the Joint Typhoon Warning Center (JTWC) issued its first advisory on the system, classifying it as Tropical Cyclone 26S. At 0000 UTC on 2 April, the Bureau of Meteorology (BOM) warning centre in Perth classified the system as Tropical Cyclone Inigo. The storm quickly intensified as it tracked southwestward, aided by low wind shear and strong divergence. Later that day, the cyclone underwent rapid intensification, as the eye became increasingly better defined. With a minimum pressure of 900 hPa, Inigo tied Cyclone Gwenda of the 1998–99 season as the most intense tropical cyclone on record in the Australian cyclone region.

Upon reaching peak intensity, Inigo maintained an eyewall  in diameter. Late on 4 April, an approaching upper-level trough increased wind shear over the system, which caused a steady weakening trend. On 5 April, the eye became cloud-filled, and later that day the cyclone reached its westernmost point before the approaching trough turned it to the southeast. By 7 April, its winds decreased to below severe tropical cyclone status, or below . The convection continued to decrease, leaving the centre exposed from the convection as it made landfall early on 8 April, in the Pilbara region of Western Australia. Inigo's circulation dissipated within 12 hours after moving ashore.

Impact

The precursor tropical disturbance dropped heavy rainfall in eastern Indonesia; on the island of Flores, Larantuka recorded  in a 24-hour period. The rainfall caused flash flooding and mudslides, primarily in Flores but also on West Timor and Sumba. In some locations, the depth of the floodwaters reached . The Oessao River in West Timor exceeded its banks, which flooded seven villages. In Kupang in West Timor, the system destroyed hundreds of homes and large fields of corn, bean, and rice crop. Heavy damage was reported near Ende, where flooding and mudslides destroyed 20 houses and destroyed the roads connecting to East Flores. In Ende, a total of 294 animals were killed. In East Flores Regency in eastern Flores Island, the system left 75 destroyed houses, along with 77 severely damaged and a further 56 receiving light damage. Damage in Indonesia totalled less than $6 million (2003 USD, $6.8 million 2007 USD), and 102 injuries were reported. The Indonesian representative to the Tropical Cyclone Committee of the World Meteorological Organization in 2004 reported the death toll related to the disaster in Indonesia as 58 fatalities.

Additionally, the precursor disturbance produced rough seas along the coastlines, which resulting in the sinking of 12 sailing vessels. Two ships, each with a crew of five to eight people, were reported missing to the southwest of Sumba, after Cyclone Inigo passed over their location on 3 April.

Inigo moved ashore on Australia as a weak tropical cyclone, though several locations reported winds near gale force. No casualties or significant damage was reported in the country.

Aftermath
Shortly after the storm passed through Indonesia, local government and Red Cross officials distributed assistance to the storm victims, including food, medicine, clean water, and mattresses; additionally, the government sent about Rp400 million (2003 IDR, $50,000 2003 USD). The affected citizens resided in temporary shelters, including schools, police offices, and shelters built by local governments. Officials deployed machines to remove debris from the roads affected by the landslides.

As a result of its damage, the name Inigo was retired subsequent to its usage; its name was replaced with Iggy, which was first used in 2012.

See also

Cyclone Mahina
List of tropical cyclones
Geography of Indonesia

References

External links

Inigo (2003)
Inigo
Inigo
Inigo
Inigo
Inigo